Incapora is a genus of land planarians in the subfamily Microplaninae.

Description 
Species of the genus Incapora are characterized by the presence of two ventral orifices that lead to the posterior branches of the gut. These intestinal branches also connect to the copulatory apparatus by anastomosis with the bursal canal.

Species 
The genus Incapora contains only two species:
Incapora anamallensis (de Beauchamp, 1930)
Incapora weyrauchi Du Bois-Reymond Marcus, 1953

References 

Geoplanidae
Rhabditophora genera
Taxa named by Eveline Du Bois-Reymond Marcus